DENIS-P J1228.2-1547 is a system of two nearly equal brown dwarfs, both are of spectral types L5.5:, located in constellation Corvus at approximately 20.2 parsecs or 66.0 light-years from Earth.

History of observations
DENIS-P J1228.2-1547 is one on the first free-floating L dwarfs discovered. It was discovered in 1997 by Xavier Delfosse and colleagues from the DENIS survey.

The second component (B) was discovered by Eduardo L. Martín and colleagues using near-infrared camera NICMOS on Hubble Space Telescope. It was announced in 1999.

See also
The other two free-floating L dwarfs, detected by Delfosse et al. and announced in 1997:
 Deep Near Infrared Survey of the Southern Sky
 DENIS-P J1058.7-1548
 DENIS-P J020529.0-115925
 DENIS-P J082303.1-491201 b
 DENIS-P J101807.5-285931

A free-floating L dwarf, detected by Kirkpatrick et al., announced also in 1997, but earlier:
 2MASP J0345432+254023

A free-floating L dwarf, detected by Ruiz et al., announced also in 1997, but later:
 Kelu-1

References

External links
SIMBAD: DENIS-P J122815.2-154733 -- Brown Dwarf (M<0.08solMass)

Corvus (constellation)
Binary stars
Brown dwarfs
L-type stars
DENIS objects
Astronomical objects discovered in 1997